Fife Heights is a census-designated place (CDP) in Pierce County, Washington, United States. The population was 2,137 at the 2010 census.  The community is bordered by Federal Way on the north, Milton on the east, Fife on the south, and Tacoma on the west. It is contained within the Puyallup Indian Reservation.

Education
Fife Heights is served by Fife Public Schools, a public school district.

References

Census-designated places in Pierce County, Washington
Census-designated places in Washington (state)